Minda Luz N. Quesada (1937-1995) was a Filipino nurse, educator, and activist best known for her work as part of the 1987 Constitutional Commission, her humanitarian and advocacy work during the Marcos dictatorship, and her leadership of the Alliance of Health Workers, a Philippine non-government organization which advocated for the rights of health workers and pushed for the Philippoines' Magna Carta of Public Health Workers. 

It was through her work in the 1987 Constitutional Commission that Health was formally enshrined in the Philippine constitution "a right of every Filipino citizen." In 2021, she was honored by having her name inscribed on the Wall of Remembrance of the Philippines' Bantayog ng mga Bayani, which recognizes the heroes and martyrs that fought the Marcos dictatorship.

References 

Individuals honored at the Bantayog ng mga Bayani
1937 births
1995 deaths